Praia Gonçalo is a settlement in the northeast of the island of Maio in Cape Verde. In 2010 population was 67. It is located 2 km north of Pedro Vaz and 18 km northeast of the island capital Porto Inglês.

See also
List of villages and settlements in Cape Verde

References
 

Villages and settlements in Maio, Cape Verde
Goncalo